Hans-Erik Dyvik Husby (15 June 1972 – 19 November 2021), also known as Hank von Helvete and Hank von Hell, was a Norwegian singer best known as the lead vocalist of the rock band Turbonegro.

Career
Von Hell's former band Turbonegro is most well known for their tongue-in-cheek humor dealing with homosexual aesthetics and punk rock antics, and the formation of a genre they label "death punk". The band formed in the late 1980s and put out a few records before disbanding in 1998 when von Hell's heroin addiction made him unable to perform. After going through rehab, Turbonegro reunited in 2002, but the band went on an indefinite hiatus in 2010. The main reason for this was his new lifestyle as a sober family man.

In 2009, he had a joint No. 1 hit alongside Maria Solheim in the Norwegian Singles Chart with "Rom for alle". The song stayed at No. 1 for three weeks including the Christmas chart for 2009.

Von Hell played the title role in Cornelis, a Swedish film from 2010 about the singer-songwriter Cornelis Vreeswijk.

On 6 June 2011, von Hell, alongside his new band Doctor Midnight & The Mercy Cult, released their first album I Declare: Treason.

In late 2011, he was a judge in the Norwegian TV series Idol. 
His biography was released in Norway October 2012, written by writer and poet Havard Rem, where he speaks openly about his life so far.

Solo career
On 31 August 2018, von Hell released his first single, "Bum to Bum", from his forthcoming solo record Egomania. The album was released on 2 November through Sony Music/Century Media worldwide.

He wrote the album with the help of guitarist and band member Eric Bachman, also known as Cat Casino. Von Hell was asked why he decided to return and produce a solo record in an interview in 2018, stating: "The timing was just right. I was done with others "angels" in life, and it felt like it was time to go back and do what I always should’ve done – ROCK. And shake ass."

On 25 January 2019, the song "Fake It" was chosen for competition in the Melodi Grand Prix 2019 to represent Norway at the Eurovision Song Contest in Israel.

Personal life and death
Hans-Erik Husby and his family moved frequently during his childhood and adolescent years, living in various places across Norway. His early childhood years were spent in the village of Å on the southwest edge of the Lofoten islands, later moving to Fauske, Rognan and Tvedestrand.

Von Hell went through detox while living at the Moskenes island in Lofoten, Norway. Here he worked at Norsk Fiskeværsmuseum in Å, as well as working as a presenter at Moskenesradioen, a local radio station.

He claimed to have dealt with his drug addiction problem thanks to the Scientology drug rehab program Narconon.

He was married to model Gro Skaustein (b. 1980) from August 2009 until October 2014. The couple had a daughter together who was born on 21 December 2008.

Von Hell died suddenly on 19 November 2021, at the age of 49, and was found dead in Slottsparken in Oslo. No cause of death has been made public, but his manager later denied rumours that he had committed suicide, stating that "his body had finally given in" after a long life of drug abuse. His former bandmate Happy-Tom paid tribute to him on social media, as did current Turbonegro frontman Tony "Duke of Nothing" Sylvester, who wrote "I never tried to fill your shoes as that would have been impossible."

Discography

Turbonegro

Albums 
 Never Is Forever (1994)
 Ass Cobra (1996)
 Apocalypse Dudes (1998)
 Scandinavian Leather (2003)
 Party Animals (2005)
 Retox (2007)

Live albums 
 Darkness Forever! (1999)

Compilations 
 Love It to Deathpunk (Australian best-of compilation, 2001)
 Small Feces (Box set of rarities, 2005)
 This Ain't No Fucking Melodic Punk 7" (Probe Records, 1995)

Splits 
 Stinky Fingers 10" vinyl (1995) – split EP with Flying Crap
 Flabby Sagging Flesh 7" vinyl (1995) – Turbonegro / Anal Babes Split

EPs 
 (He's a) Grunge Whore 10" vinyl EP (1993)

Singles 
 "Denim Demon" 7" vinyl (1995)
 "Bad Mongo" 7" vinyl (1995)
 "I Got Erection" 7" vinyl (1995)
 "Prince of the Rodeo" 7" vinyl (1996)
 "Suffragette City" 7" vinyl (1997)
 "Get It On" 7" vinyl (1998)
 "Fuck the World (F.T.W.)" 7" vinyl & CD (2003)
 "Locked Down" 7" vinyl & CD (2003)
 "Sell Your Body (to the Night)" 7" vinyl & CD (2003)
 "High on the Crime" (2005)
 "City of Satan" CD (2005)
 "Do You Do You Dig Destruction" mobile-only download & CD (2007)

Solo

Albums 
 I ljuset av Cornelis (2010) – Cover album with songs from Swedish/Dutch singer-songwriter Cornelis Vreeswijk
 Egomania (2018)
 Dead (2020)

Singles 
 "Vi mot världen" (2017)
 "Fake It" (2019)

Other solo albums
 2009: "Rom for alle" (duo with Maria Solheim – #1 hit in Norway in 2009)

References

External links

 
 

1972 births
2021 deaths
Melodi Grand Prix contestants
Norwegian rock singers
Turbonegro members
Doctor Midnight & The Mercy Cult members
People from Moskenes